The U-15 Baseball World Cup is the 15-and-under baseball world championship that features national teams as authorized ("sanctioned") by the World Baseball Softball Confederation (WBSC). It began in 1989 as the World Youth Baseball Championship. In 2012 it became the 15U Baseball World Cup and is contested every two years. Because it is a world championship event, the results of the 15U Baseball World Cup affect the WBSC World Rankings.

The 15U Baseball World Cup is the pinnacle of baseball in this youth category. Like the 12U Baseball World Cup, the 15U Baseball World Cup is the only world championship across all of sport to feature national teams in its age group, with the best young baseball players in the world selected to represent their countries, unlike other youth international competitions like the Little League World Series, which involve local clubs and have limitations imposed on the selection of players.

Results

Medal table

 Chinese Taipei is the official WBSC designation for the team representing the state officially referred to as the Republic of China, more commonly known as Taiwan. (See also political status of Taiwan for details.)

See also
Baseball awards#World
International Baseball Federation
World Baseball Softball Confederation

References

 
under
Youth baseball competitions
Under-15 sport
U-15
Recurring sporting events established in 1989
World Baseball Softball Confederation competitions